Adrianna Louise "Anna" Prins (born January 27, 1991) is a professional basketball player who was the 23rd pick in the 2013 WNBA Draft.

College
Prins was the fourth highest WNBA Draft pick in Iowa State women's basketball history.

Iowa  State statistics

Source

References

External links
 Iowa State bio
 Anna Prins at Ames Tribune.com

1991 births
Living people
American women's basketball players
Basketball players from Arizona
Basketball players from Colorado
Iowa State Cyclones women's basketball players
Sportspeople from Mesa, Arizona